Dakoutun is a town of Baodi District, in the northern suburbs of Tianjin, People's Republic of China. , it had 58 villages under its administration.

In 2001, Nanrenfu Xiang was eliminated and merged with Dakoutun Town. Nanrenfu is also the name of villages, schools and companies in the area. In the sixth & seventh editions of the Contemporary Chinese Dictionary published in 2012 & 2016, Nanrenfu is the only example given for the usage of the character ''.

See also
List of township-level divisions of Tianjin

References

Towns in Tianjin